Avudim is an old and uncommon Russian Christian male first name. The name is possibly derived from the Greek word aoidimos, meaning praised in song, or from Serbian Muslim phrase meaning Dima's father (a moniker referring to a married person).

Its diminutive is Dima.

The patronymics derived from "Avudim" are "" (Avudimovich; masculine) and "" (Avudimovna; feminine).

References

Notes

Sources
Н. А. Петровский (N. A. Petrovsky). "Словарь русских личных имён" (Dictionary of Russian First Names). ООО Издательство "АСТ". Москва, 2005. 
[1] А. В. Суперанская (A. V. Superanskaya). "Современный словарь личных имён: Сравнение. Происхождение. Написание" (Modern Dictionary of First Names: Comparison. Origins. Spelling). Айрис-пресс. Москва, 2005. 
[2] А. В. Суперанская (A. V. Superanskaya). "Словарь русских имён" (Dictionary of Russian Names). Издательство Эксмо. Москва, 2005. 

